Gerda Ulast (also Romanized as Gerdā Ūlāst; also known as Gerdeh Ūlāst) is a village in Gurab Pas Rural District, in the Central District of Fuman County, Gilan Province, Iran. At the 2006 census, its population was 99, in 29 families.

References 

Populated places in Fuman County